Inner Mongolia First Machinery Group Corporation (内蒙古第一机械集团有限公司, abbrev. 一机), previously First Inner Mongolia Machinery Factory, is a military manufacturing company in China. It is a facility in Inner Mongolia and supplier of various military equipment to the PLA Army.  It has also been known as Factory 617 (六一七厂) and the Baotou Tank Plant.

Products
 MBT-2000 main battle tank
 Type 96 main battle tank
 Type 88 main battle tank 
 Type 69/79 main battle tank
 Type 59 main battle tank
 Chinese firefighting tank
 BeiBen Truck Mercedes Benz licensed heavy trucks
 Train wagons
 Bulldozer
 sucker roads
 welding steel products

External links
 China's large tank manufacturing plant - YouTube

Defence companies of the People's Republic of China
Companies with year of establishment missing
Companies based in Baotou